Simon Geschke (born 13 March 1986) is a German professional road cyclist, who currently rides for UCI WorldTeam .

Biography

He is the son of former track cyclist Jürgen Geschke. In the 2015 Tour de France, Geschke won a mountain stage as he was part of the breakaway and soloed across the line in Pra-Loup.

In 2022 Geschke entered the Tour de France for the tenth time in his career. For the first time in his career he wore a classification jersey after getting involved in the breakaway on stage 9, and earning enough points to take the lead in the mountains classification. Initially it was his intent to go for the stage win rather than the jersey classification. He chose to attack for the mountain points on stage nine because he did not feel it would be realistic to attack in the upcoming high mountains, which included five HC climbs with Col du Granon and Alpe d'Huez being among them, however he was able to defend the jersey through these climbs in the Alps and into the third week of the race. He lost the jersey on the final HC climb of the Tour de France when Jonas Vingegaard won the race. He set a record for German riders with nine days as King of the Mountains.

Geschke has been a vegan since 2016.

Major results

2006
 7th Overall Tour de Guadeloupe
 9th Overall Cinturón a Mallorca
2007
 7th Overall Ronde de l'Isard
1st Stage 1
2008
 4th Overall Giro delle Regioni
 6th Overall Grand Prix du Portugal
 8th Overall Ronde de l'Isard
2009
 9th Overall Bayern Rundfahrt
 10th Eschborn–Frankfurt City Loop
2010
 3rd Overall Tour de Seoul
 4th Overall Bayern Rundfahrt
 4th Hel van het Mergelland
 6th Overall Circuit de Lorraine
 10th Eschborn–Frankfurt City Loop
2011
 1st Stage 2 Critérium International
 4th Hel van het Mergelland
 8th Eschborn–Frankfurt City Loop
 10th Brabantse Pijl
2012
 2nd Volta Limburg Classic
2013
 5th Overall Bayern Rundfahrt
 5th Brabantse Pijl
 8th Roma Maxima
 9th Grand Prix Cycliste de Québec
2014
 1st Grand Prix of Aargau Canton
 4th Brabantse Pijl
 6th Amstel Gold Race
 9th Roma Maxima
 10th Strade Bianche
2015
 1st RaboRonde Heerlen
 Tour de France
1st Stage 17
 Combativity award Stage 17
 1st  Sprints classification, Vuelta a Andalucía
 Giro d'Italia
Held  after Stages 9–10
2019
 1st  Mountains classification, Tour de Pologne
2020
 3rd Overall Tour Down Under
 5th Gran Piemonte
 6th Overall Volta ao Algarve
 10th La Flèche Wallonne
2021
 7th Polynormande
2022
 3rd Overall Tour de Romandie
 3rd Road race, National Road Championships
 10th Trofeo Pollença – Port d'Andratx
 Tour de France
Held  after Stages 9–17
 Combativity award Stage 7
2023
 7th Overall O Gran Camiño

Grand Tour general classification results timeline

References

External links

1986 births
Living people
German male cyclists
Cyclists from Berlin
German Tour de France stage winners
Cyclists at the 2016 Summer Olympics
Olympic cyclists of Germany